John Leary (November 1, 1837 – February 8, 1905) was an American businessman and politician who was a key civic leader in Seattle, Washington. He made contributions to virtually all civic and business activities during the city's early years.

Leary started as a lumber merchant in New Brunswick, Canada, at 17. A successful entrepreneur, he accumulated "a modest fortune" and traveled to Seattle in 1869 in search of greater opportunities. Leary died one of the richest person in Seattle, with a net worth of $2 million, most of which was acquired through real estate deals in Seattle and vicinity. He participated in many other Seattle projects, including railroads, mining, banking, water and gas works, steamship operations, law, and others. Many of his activities were unprofitable, but served an important public purpose. He was also known for his extensive charitable contributions.

Leary served multiple terms as Seattle councilman and one as Seattle mayor, in 1885. He co-founded the Seattle Chamber of Commerce, Rainier Club, and First National Bank of Seattle, Seattle's first bank. From 1878 to 1890, Leary played one of the most prominent roles in Seattle's battle with the Northern Pacific Railroad for an independent railroad connection—a key element of Seattle's subsequent commercial success and leadership in Washington State.

Leary financed the construction of the steamwheeler Bailey Gatzert, the finest ship in Puget Sound at the time. His mining operation led to the founding of Ravensdale, Washington (initially named for him). Leary's home, the most expensive residence in the city of the time, was listed on the National Register of Historic Places. Two Seattle streets, Leary Way and Leary Avenue, bear his name.

East Coast career 

Leary was born on November 1, 1837, to a family of Irish descent, in Saint John, New Brunswick, on the Eastern coast of Canada. He soon demonstrated an "unusual aptitude for business," and at 17, started a successful lumber trading business in St. John. This business soon expanded into the neighboring town of Woodstock. By the age of 30, he had accumulated a "modest fortune" and ran his own lumber camp on the banks of the Meduxnekeag River.

The Meduxnekeag riverbed spans from the confluence of its North and South Branches near Houlton, Maine in the United States to Woodstock in Canada. The 1866 expiration of the Canadian–American Reciprocity Treaty resulted in substantial losses to Leary's business. Initially, he moved to Houlton in an attempt to run his business from Maine, but soon decided to take his chances on the Western frontier. Leary worked in lumbering until 1867.

West Coast career 
In 1869, Leary arrived in Seattle, then a village with unpaved streets supporting a population of less than 1,000 people. Unlike the typical Washington Territory entrepreneur of the time, Leary didn't limit himself to a particular area of business, but engaged in a panoply of activities. In the words of Samuel L. Crawford, a Washingtonian journalist of the time, "Mr. Leary had an unusually active mind and was a great promoter. His great 'stunt' was to start some big enterprise and, after it was well under way, drop out of it himself. In this manner, he fathered many of the big schemes of the day."

As a result, over the next 20 years, Leary was involved in multiple operations simultaneously. He "touched every line of public progress" of Seattle, often at personal loss. Nevertheless, by the beginning of the 20th century, Leary had accumulated a fortune estimated at $2 million ($53,000,000), mostly from his investments in Seattle real estate. He died one of the richest people in Seattle.

Law practice 

Leary was admitted to the bar in 1871, becoming a "pioneer lawyer" in Washington Territory. That same year, he became a junior partner in McNaught & Leary law firm. In 1872, McNaught & Leary was one of five law firms in Seattle and one of the six most active law firms in Washington Territory. One of Leary's most consistent occupations in Seattle was law; he was active in this area for eleven years.

In 1878, James F. McNaught became an attorney for the Northern Pacific Railroad Company, and the law firm dissolved. Leary initially started his own law practice, but then formed another firm with Henry G. Struve. The Struve & Leary Company was organized in 1878, and in 1880, when J.C. Haines joined the firm, it was renamed Struve, Haines & Leary. Leary stayed with the firm until 1882, when he left to devote himself to business and civic activities.

Mining 
In 1872, Leary opened the Talbot coal mine (located in present-day Renton) with partners John Collins and James F. McNaught. Later, Leary was elected one of the venture's directors.

This operation was the first to deliver coal to Seattle. To ship the coal to Yesler's Wharf in Seattle, they laid  of railroad track towards the Black River. However, as the bed proved to be badly faulted, the mine closed after a few years.

Between 1878 and 1880, Leary financed several geological expeditions in Washington, which normally would have been financed by local governments, to develop the region. The parties explored the West Coast towards Cape Flattery, the Skagit and Similkameen rivers, and parts of Eastern Washington. The expeditions confirmed the presence of rich coal and iron deposits, and the reports were made available to the public.

In 1884, together with J.M. Colman, Leary took part in the opening of the Cedar River mines. He was also an early stockholder in other mines around Renton.

Leary's most substantial mining effort was the creation of the Leary Coal Company, which developed coal mines in Ravensdale. This mining town was founded by Leary, and initially bore his name. Its original output of 48,000 tons in 1900 increased to 185,000 tons by 1905. The large coal shipments were made possible by a dedicated railroad line financed by other railroad projects with Leary's involvement, and connected the mines to the Northern Pacific Railway. After Leary's death, the mine was sold to Northern Pacific, which maintained a yearly output of 120,000+ tons of coal through 1915, when an accident killed 31 miners and prompted the company to abandon the mines.

Utilities 
Leary organized various ventures that helped build Seattle's infrastructure, often without regard for their potential profitability.

In November 1881, Spring Hill Water Company (earlier purchased by Leary with Jacob Furth and Bailey Gatzert because of its insolvency) was the first to lay water pipes along Seattle streets, pumping water from Lake Washington. This created Seattle's first water system, and by 1886, its capacity reached . At some point, Leary served as the president of the сompany. In 1890, he and his partners sold the company to the city for $352,000 ($9,000,000).

Leary also helped organize the city's first gas company, and served as its president until 1878.

Banking 
In September 1882, Leary participated in the founding of Seattle's first bank, the First National Bank of Seattle. (Before 1882, only a loan business founded by Dexter Horton operated in town.) Among Leary's partners in this enterprise were William S. Ladd, a famous banker from Oregon; Henry Yesler, Seattle's richest citizen, C.L. Dingley, G.W. Harris, and J.R. Lewis. The bank opened on November 15, 1882, with $150,000 ($4,000,000) in capital.

The bank's solvency and stability helped the city withstand the Panic of 1893. Leary served as the president of the bank, but later "was obliged to resign … owing to the pressure of his other business interests." First National later merged into Seafirst Bank, which was eventually acquired by the Bank of America.

In 1889, Leary was a member of the board of trustees of the People's Savings Bank in Seattle.

Media 

In 1878, Leary founded the Seattle Post journal. He was the principal owner of the journal from 1880 until 1882 when he engineered a merge with the Seattle Intelligencer. He built the Post building, a new modern office building for the Seattle Post-Intelligencer at a prime location. By 1884, Leary had sold all interest in the combined paper.

In 1890, together with several partners, Leary purchased the Seattle Trade Journal, which was established in 1888 by Edmond S. Meany and Alexander Begg. A year later, he sold it to The Seattle Telegraph.

In 1890, Leary was one of the leading stockholders of the Morning Journal Publishing company. That year, the company made an unsuccessful attempt to publish a Democratic Morning Journal, which was absorbed by the Telegraph the following year.

Real Estate 

Leary's multiple investments in real estate were based on his firm belief in the future of Washington Territory, and in Seattle in particular. These convictions proved accurate, and his real estate investments became the main source of his accumulated fortune.

For example, in 1883, together with Judge Thomas Burke and William R. Ballard, Leary purchased  of land on Salmon Bay. Around 1890, it was divided into individual plots and sold to new settlers, forming the city of Ballard (now a suburb of Seattle).

Among Leary's other notable investments were the Cosmopolitan Hotel, the Seattle Post building, and the Yesler-Leary Block. The latter was built in 1883. It was considered the most prestigious piece of commercial real estate and the biggest office building in Seattle at the time. Constructed in a joint venture with Henry Yesler in 1883 at a cost of over $100,000 ($3,000,000), this office building was destroyed in the Great Seattle Fire on June 6, 1889.

Politics and civic activism 
Like the majority of Washington Territory settlers of the time, Leary was a Republican.  His contemporaries described him as an "outstanding civic leader," a "natural leader," and "a pioneer among pioneers."

Leary served three terms as Seattle councilman, in 1873, 1875, and 1876.

In 1884, receiving 1311 votes, he was elected to serve as mayor of Seattle in 1884–1885. Seattle citizens cheered for him during one of the biggest political meetings ever held in Occidental Square. Leary was elected mayor on a ticket created by businessmen in opposition to the Law and Order League. At the time, the League was led by the "moralistic elements," including recently enfranchised women activists who lobbied for liquor and gambling regulations. Later, Leary damaged the relationship with his conservative supporters by allowing raids on saloons and houses of prostitution in attempt to "placate women's and reform groups."

At the time, the position of mayor wasn't salaried, but was regarded as a civic duty. Leary was the first mayor to hold regular office hours. He worked on improving downtown streets, and pleasantly surprised Seattleites by investing his own money to plank 1st Avenue—Seattle's first street-paving project. Leary ran for re-election, but lost.

In late 1885–early 1886, "anti-Chinese agitation" (a result of race antagonism, business depression, and poor enforcement of the Chinese Exclusion Act of 1882) occurred in many Western cities. Many white Americans blamed the business depression of 1882–1885 on cheap Chinese labor, which was considered strong competition to white Americans. The racism turned violent  in September, when white laborers attacked Chinese workers causing the Rock Springs massacre followed by an attack in Squak Valley (now Issaquah, Washington). As the agitation reached Seattle, Leary attempted to convince the Chinese to leave the city before any violence had occurred, but he was unsuccessful. Intense anti-Chinese riots rocked Seattle (as many other places on the West Coast), and eventually an "anti-Chinese congress" held in Seattle issued a decree to expel all Chinese people from Western Washington.

In 1890, Leary was an incorporating member of the board of trustees of the Seattle Chamber of Commerce. He served as the Chamber's president for two separate terms, the first being in 1890–1891.

In 1892, during an economic downturn, Leary ran for mayor again on a Republican ticket, but lost to Democrat Judge James T. Ronald.

Transportation

Seattle's first railroads 

The Northern Pacific Railroad was the first transcontinental railroad to reach Puget Sound. After a few years of surveying, in 1873 the railroad unexpectedly decided that Tacoma, not Seattle, would be its western terminus. That decision would direct most commercial traffic to the Port of Tacoma, condemning Seattle to a subservient position in the region. Dependent on commerce, the Seattle population panicked and started planning to relocate their businesses and families to Tacoma.

Leary managed to curtail the panic with a characteristic stunt. He sold one of his hotels for $600 ($16,000) and used the proceedings to purchase a large quantity of piles, sinking them in straight lines along a potential railroad bed leading into Seattle. The resulting illusion of someone building a railroad into Seattle led to multiple rumors that stopped the initial panic, and thus the exodus of people from Seattle.

To resolve the problem in the long term, however, Seattle desperately needed a railroad connection. The situation was exacerbated by the fact that Northern Pacific Railroad had invested massively in Tacoma real estate and was actively luring Seattleites to relocate there.

Leary's stunt led to the establishment of the Seattle and Walla Walla Railroad, which planned to connect Settle to Walla Walla via Snoqualmie Pass and direct at least some commercial traffic into the Port of Seattle. Several prominent citizens backed the project financially, including Arthur Denny, John Collins, Franklin Mathias, Angus Mackintosh, Henry Yesler, James McNaught, J. J. McGilvra, J. M. Colman, and Dexter Horton, but Leary wasn't among the investors. It soon became apparent that Walla Walla had little interest in the project, and Seattleites' resources alone were insufficient (the construction was estimated to cost $4 million ($106,000,000). The construction of the railroad began in 1874, but never went beyond King County.

In 1881, a temporarily leadership change at Northern Pacific led the company to build a connection to Seattle and Walla Walla Railroad at Black River. Service to Seattle began in 1884; however, Northern Pacific continued using its monopoly power in favor of its Tacoma business interests and discriminated against Seattle merchants.

The problem wasn't resolved until Seattle commenced another railroad—Seattle, Lake Shore and Eastern Railway (SLS&E)—which would connect Seattle via Snohomish, Sedro-Woolley, and Sumas to the Canadian Pacific Railway, thus circumventing Northern Pacific entirely. Leary was one of the organizers, incorporators, directors, and investors of SLS&E, but the bulk of the investment came from New York bankers.

Leary played a part in the final battle for Seattle's independent railroad connection. As the construction of SLS&E proceeded in 1885 towards Snohomish, a Tacoma judge issued a writ on behalf of Northern Pacific, ordering Snohomish authorities to stop the construction of the essential Snohomish bridge. An ensuing legal battle would have resulted in a delay, leading to the violation of the financial agreement with New York bankers and thus endangering the entire operation. Along with Judge Thomas Burke, another principal investor in SLS&E, Leary commandeered a SLS&E railroad engine and rushed it to Snohomish. They arrived before the writ did, and convinced the local sheriff and deputies to "disappear for a couple of days" so no one could enforce the writ until the matter could be resolved in court. Putting all available personnel to work, SLS&E completed the bridge on time.

In 1882, Leary was also one of the founders of the Baker City Railway.

Maritime transportation 

In 1877, Leary co-owned the Zephyr with George Harris and Captain William Ballard. In 1879, Leary and Harris sold their shares and Ballard became the sole owner.

With Seattle railroad connections secured, the Port of Seattle experienced a boom of maritime transportation; about $1 million ($26,000,000) worth of new steamers were added to the fleet of companies operating from Seattle in 1890. Leary contributed by organizing the Seattle Steam Navigation & Transportation Company, incorporated with $500,000 ($13,000,000) of capital stock. Leary served as the company's first president alongside other principal investors: Jacob Furth, Edward Neufelder, W.R. Ballard, and H.G. Struve.

Leary built the steamer Bailey Gatzert for SSN&T. One of the finest steamers of her time, it was named after Leary's friend and close business associate Bailey Gatzert, and cost between $100,000 ($2,600,000) and $125,000 ($3,300,000).

In 1891, steamboat operators consolidated into the Columbia River & Puget Sound Navigation Company. The president of the new company was Captain Uriah Bonsor Scott, and Leary became the vice-president. The company owned various steamers, including Telephone, Fleetwood, Flyer and Leary's Bailey Gatzert. They operated between Puget Sound and Victoria, British Columbia.

Leary also played a significant role in organizing the first mail route from Seattle to Alaska.

Other activities 
Leary organized and served as president of the West Coast Improvement Company, Seattle Land & Improvement Company, and the Seattle Warehouse & Elevator Company. He was one of the directors and promoters of the James Street & Broadway Cable & Electric line and of the West Street & North End Electric Railway Company.

Leary was an Irish National League of America governing council member and a member of the University of Washington Board of Regents, lobbying for free education and textbooks for all students.

Personal life

Family 

John Leary was married twice, but had no children from either marriage. He married his first wife, Mary Blanchard, on November 26, 1858, in Littleton, Maine. She died on July 17, 1890, in San Francisco, "after a short illness."

On April 21, 1892, Leary married Governor Elisha P. Ferry's daughter, Eliza P. Ferry.

The family resided on the corner of 2nd Avenue and Madison Street. In 1903, Leary started the construction of a new family home at a prime location in Capitol Hill, overlooking Lake Washington. It was estimated to be the most expensive private residence in Seattle at the time. The architects were John Graham (the founder of John Graham & Company, later credited for many historic Seattle landmarks, including the Space Needle) and Arthur Bodley.

The new house wasn't fully completed before Leary's death, but remained the residence of his widow and a famous place for social and charitable gatherings until Eliza Leary's death in 1935. In 1948, the Episcopal Diocese of Olympia purchased the house which remains its headquarters in 2020. The house was added to the National Register of Historic Places in 1972.

At the time of his death, two of Leary's relatives were known to be still living: his sister Margaret (or Maggie) Leary Baker of Philadelphia, and Jane Leary of Fredericton, New Brunswick.

Charitable activities 
Leary was known for a broad spectrum of charitable activities. His associate, Alfred Battle, described Leary as "...the most charitable man I ever knew. He gave money to everybody he thought needed it."

Both of Leary's wives engaged in charitable activities and donated to notable causes. Mary B. Leary was the founder and president of the Ladies Relief Society of Seattle, organized in 1884 to help unfortunate families and individuals. Eliza P. Leary was an active member of Seattle's Sunset Club and a member of the local chapter of the Daughters of the American Revolution.

Organizations 
Leary was among the original founders of the Rainier Club, one of Seattle's most prestigious organizations. He became its president in 1890 and served at least through 1891.

In addition, Leary was an officer in Seattle's chapter of the Royal Arch Masons and a member of a local chapter of Odd Fellows.

Death and legacy 
Leary suffered from liver disease in the last three years of his life. He withdrew from most business activities and spent substantial time in Southern California. He also made two trips to Carlsbad, Germany.

Leary died of heart failure in Riverside, California, on February 8, 1905.   His body was transported to Seattle, and his funeral took place on February 15. He was buried at Lake View Cemetery on Capitol Hill.

Leary died one of the wealthiest person in Seattle, leaving a fortune valued at $2 million ($53,000,000). It was left almost entirely to his wife, Eliza. A Seattle street, Leary Way, was named after him.

See also 
 Rainier Club
 Ravensdale, Washington
 Bailey Gatzert
 Elisha P. Ferry

Notes

References

Literature cited

External links 

 HistoryLink Essay
 

1837 births
1905 deaths
American people of Irish descent
Mayors of Seattle
Washington (state) pioneers
History of Seattle
Seattle City Council members
American city founders
Politicians from Saint John, New Brunswick
19th-century American politicians